"Whiskey Business" is the nineteenth episode of the twenty-fourth season of the American animated television series The Simpsons, and the 527th episode overall. Its title is a play on Risky Business. It originally aired on the Fox network in the United States on May 5, 2013. In its original airing, "Whiskey Business" was delayed 25 minutes in Eastern and Central time zones due to the end of a NASCAR race at Talladega Superspeedway which was delayed more than 3 hours due to rain.

Plot
Noticing that Moe has fallen into a bout of suicidal depression, Homer, Marge, Lenny and Carl take him on an excursion to Capital City and buy him a new suit to lift his spirits. His enthusiasm restored, Moe fixes up his bar in order to attract a better class of customers and brings out a batch of homemade whiskey. Two venture capitalists stop by the bar, sample the drink, and are so impressed that they offer to become Moe's business partners in marketing it. Shortly before the new company's initial public offering, his suit is destroyed when he gets caught in an elevator door. Moe appears at the stock exchange in his ordinary clothes and addresses the traders for the IPO, but he inadvertently scares them so badly that his stock price plummets and the company becomes worthless. Returning to his once-again-squalid bar, he brightens up enough to sweep up the pieces of a broken beer mug and forgets about committing suicide, at least for the time being.

Meanwhile, Grampa watches the children while Homer and Marge are away. An elaborate prank by Bart, Dolph, Jimbo, and Kearney leads to Grampa being injured, and Bart decides to care for him at home in order to avoid getting in trouble. With Grampa hiding in the basement to avoid being found, the two enjoy playing tricks on Homer. Grampa recovers quickly, but fakes a lingering injury in order to make sure that Bart keeps looking after him. Bart eventually discovers the deception and is angry, but the two reconcile after Grampa explains that he liked getting the sort of personal attention that he never could receive at the nursing home.

In order to keep Lisa from finding out about Grampa, Bart sends her to a jazz club where an all-star jam session is taking place. She is shocked to see Bleeding Gums Murphy among the performers, as she knows him to be dead, and discovers that he is actually a hologram. Outraged, she tries to start a boycott of Murphy's record label; shortly afterward, she is surprised to receive a visit from saxophonist Sonny Rollins at home. Rollins explains that holograms are simply the next step in the development of the entertainment industry. Realizing that he too is a hologram sent by the record company, Lisa becomes annoyed when the company proceeds to beam commercials that feature Diana, Princess of Wales, Tupac Shakur and Mahatma Gandhi into her living room.

Reception

Critical reception
This episode received mixed reviews from critics.

Robert David Sullivan of The A.V. Club gave the episode a C−, saying "I’ve been complaining about the dark humor in many Simpsons episodes this season, but it’s unimaginative dark humor that’s disappointing. I’m a champion of the episode ‘Homer’s Enemy,’ all the way to its grim conclusion, and I love every blood-spurting moment of the Itchy and Scratchy cartoons. But ‘Whiskey Business’ just bangs on the one note of Moe being so depressed he can’t even muster the energy to end it all. An episode that actually depicted a suicide would at least win points for going to extremes."

Teresa Lopez of TV Fanatic gave the episode two and a half stars out of five, saying "In addition to the Moe and Lisa plots, the show also tried to shoehorn another story involving Grampa and Bart bonding when Grampa gets injured on Bart's makeshift waterslide. There were some cute moments between the two, but the episode had far too many threads going to make any of them really satisfactory."

Ratings
The episode received a 1.9 in the 18–49 demographic and was watched by a total of 4.43 million viewers. This made it the third most watched show on Fox's Animation Domination line up that night.

References

External links 
 
 "Whiskey Business" at theSimpsons.com

The Simpsons (season 24) episodes
2013 American television episodes
Television episodes about suicide